The Australian Football League North East Border Female Football League (AFL NEB FFL) is a Women's Australian rules football competition based in the greater North East Victoria region of Victoria, Australia.

History
The league was established in 2015 as a pathway for young girls who wanted to continue playing football after Auskick but were unable to compete in traditional male leagues across the region. Since its inception the league has grown to seven clubs and two competitions, one for women aged 13 to 16, and a second open-age competition for women aged 17 years and over.

Clubs

Seasons

2015
 Australian Football League North East Border Youth Girls
 Grand Final: Lavington def. Wodonga Raiders

2016
 Australian Football League North East Border Youth Girls

2017
 Australian Football League North East Border Youth Girls
T.B.A.

2018
 Australian Football League North East Border Female Football League Women's Open
T.B.A.

 Australian Football League North East Border Female Football League Youth Girls
T.B.A.

2019
 Australian Football League North East Border Female Football League Women's Open
T.B.A.

 Australian Football League North East Border Female Football League Youth Girls
T.B.A.

Notes

References

External links
Official AFL NEB Female Football League Website

Australian rules football competitions in Victoria (Australia)